Jaume Rovira may refer to:

Jacme Rovira, Catalan poet
Jaume Rovira (cyclist) (born 1979), Spanish racing cyclist